The Young Hollywood Awards was awards presented annually which honored the year's biggest achievements in pop music, movies, sports, television, fashion and more, as voted on by teenagers aged 13–19 and young adults. The award ceremonies also honored rising and promising young aged performers in Hollywood. The award ceremony usually featured a high number of celebrities and musical performers such as Taylor Swift, Selena Gomez, and Nick Jonas.

The Young Hollywood Awards started in 1999. The final award ceremony was 2014.

Categories
In 2010, the following categories were awarded:

Young Hollywood Newcomer of the Year
Young Hollywood Artist of the Year
Young Hollywood Superstar in the Making
Young Hollywood Breakthrough of the Year
Young Hollywood Comedian of the Year
Young Hollywood Cast to Watch
Young Hollywood Making their Mark
Young Hollywood Style Icon

The categories which have been removed from the awards were Superstar of Tomorrow and Best Role Model.

Awards ceremonies
2013 Young Hollywood Awards
2014 Young Hollywood Awards

References

American film awards
American television awards
American music awards
Awards established in 1999
1999 establishments in the United States